The men's 4x400 metres relay event at the 1994 World Junior Championships in Athletics was held in Lisbon, Portugal, at Estádio Universitário de Lisboa on 23 and 24 July.

Medalists

Results

Final
24 July

Heats
23 July

Heat 1

Heat 2

Heat 3

Participation
According to an unofficial count, 76 athletes from 18 countries participated in the event.

References

4 x 400 metres relay
Relays at the World Athletics U20 Championships